In mathematics, especially in algebraic topology, the homotopy limit and colimitpg 52 are variants of the notions of limit and colimit extended to the homotopy category . The main idea is this: if we have a diagramconsidered as an object in the homotopy category of diagrams , (where the homotopy equivalence of diagrams is considered pointwise), then the homotopy limit and colimits then correspond to the cone and coconewhich are objects in the homotopy category , where  is the category with one object and one morphism. Note this construction can be generalized to model categories, which give techniques for constructing homotopy limits and colimits in terms of other homotopy categories, such as derived categories. Another perspective formalizing these kinds of constructions are derivatorspg 193 which are a new framework for homotopical algebra.

Introductory examples

Homotopy pushout
The concept of homotopy colimitpg 4-8 is a generalization of homotopy  pushouts, such as the mapping cylinder used to define a cofibration. This notion is motivated by the following observation: the (ordinary) pushout 

is the space obtained by contracting the n-1-sphere (which is the boundary of the n-dimensional disk) to a single point. This space is homeomorphic to the n-sphere Sn. On the other hand, the pushout

is a point. Therefore, even though the (contractible) disk Dn was replaced by a point, (which is homotopy equivalent to the disk), the two pushouts are not homotopy (or weakly) equivalent.

Therefore, the pushout is not well-aligned with a principle of homotopy theory, which considers weakly equivalent spaces as carrying the same information: if one (or more) of the spaces used to form the pushout is replaced by a weakly equivalent space, the pushout is not guaranteed to stay weakly equivalent. The homotopy pushout rectifies this defect.

The homotopy pushout of two maps  of topological spaces is defined as
,
i.e., instead of glueing B in both A and C, two copies of a cylinder on B are glued together and their ends are glued to A and C. 
For example, the homotopy colimit of the diagram (whose maps are projections)
 
is the join .

It can be shown that the homotopy pushout does not share the defect of the ordinary pushout: replacing A, B and / or C by a homotopic space, the homotopy pushout will also be homotopic. In this sense, the homotopy pushouts treats homotopic spaces as well as the (ordinary) pushout does with homeomorphic spaces.

Composition of maps 
Another useful and motivating examples of a homotopy colimit is constructing models for the homotopy colimit of the diagramof topological spaces. There are a number of ways to model this colimit: the first is to consider the spacewhere  is the equivalence relation identifyingwhich can pictorially be described as the pictureBecause we can similarly interpret the diagram above as the commutative diagram, from properties of categories, we get a commutative diagramgiving a homotopy colimit. We could guess this looks likebut notice we have introduced a new cycle to fill in the new data of the composition. This creates a technical problem which can be solved using simplicial techniques: giving a method for constructing a model for homotopy colimits. The new diagram, forming the homotopy colimit of the composition diagram pictorially is represented asgiving another model of the homotopy colimit which is homotopy equivalent to the original diagram (without the composition of ) given above.

Mapping telescope
The homotopy colimit of a sequence of spaces 
 
is the mapping telescope. One example computation is taking the homotopy colimit of a sequence of cofibrations. The colimit of pg 62 this diagram gives a homotopy colimit. This implies we could compute the homotopy colimit of any mapping telescope by replacing the maps with cofibrations.

General definition

Homotopy limit
Treating examples such as the mapping telescope and the homotopy pushout on an equal footing can be achieved by considering an -diagram of spaces, where  is some "indexing" category. This is a functor

The category of such diagrams is denoted .

There is a natural functor called the diagonal,

In (ordinary) category theory, the right adjoint to this functor is the limit. The homotopy limit is defined by altering this situation: it is the right adjoint to 

which sends a space  to the -diagram which at some object  gives  

Here  is the slice category (its objects are arrows , where  is any object of ),  is the nerve of this category and |-| is the topological realization of this simplicial set.

Homotopy colimit
Similarly, one can define a colimit as the left adjoint to the diagonal functor  given above.  To define a homotopy colimit, we must modify  in a different way.  A homotopy colimit can be defined as the left adjoint to a functor  where
,

Examples 
A homotopy pullback (or homotopy fiber-product) is the dual concept of a homotopy pushout.

The universal property of a homotopy pullback yields the natural map , a special case of a natural map from a limit to a homotopy limit. In the case of a homotopy fiber, this map is an inclusion of a fiber to a homotopy fiber.

Construction of colimits with simplicial replacements 
Given a small category  and a diagram , we can construct the homotopy colimit using a simplicial replacement of the diagram. This is a simplicial space,  given by the diagrampg 16-17 wheregiven by chains of composable maps in the indexing category .

Relation to the (ordinary) colimit and limit
There is always a map 

Typically, this map is not a weak equivalence. For example, the homotopy pushout encountered above always maps to the ordinary pushout.

Further examples and applications
Just as limit is used to complete a ring, holim is used to complete a spectrum.

See also 

 Derivator
Homotopy fiber
Homotopy cofiber
 Cohomology of categories
 Spectral sequence of homotopy colimits

References 

A Primer on Homotopy Colimits
Homotopy colimits in the category of small categories
Categories and Orbispaces

Further reading 
Homotopy limit-colimit diagrams in stable model categories
pg.80 Homotopy Colimits and Limits

Homotopy theory
Category theory
Homotopical algebra